The Hertford loop line (also known colloquially as the Hertford Loop) is a branch of the East Coast Main Line, part of the Northern City Line commuter route to London for Hertford and other Hertfordshire towns and an occasional diversion route for the main line. The line is part of the Network Rail Strategic Route 8, SRS 08.03 and is classified as a London and South East Commuter line.

History
The line was opened in three stages between 1871 and 1924. The first section called the Enfield Branch Railway was developed by the London and York Railway and went from Wood Green to Enfield. In 1898, a plan was approved to extend the line north to Hertford and Stevenage, in order to relieve congestion on the main line without having to widen the Welwyn Viaduct. Work started in 1905 and Cuffley was reached on 4 April 1910. Then it was single track and for goods services only. The line finally opened to passengers on 2 June 1924 when a new Hertford North Station was opened. The line was electrified in 1977.

The line was also used frequently during the Second World War as the Welwyn/Digswell Viaduct was at high risk from bombs.

Route and settlements served
The Hertford Line leaves the East Coast Main Line at Langley junction, just south of Stevenage.

Watton-at-Stone, serving the village of Watton-at-Stone
Hertford North, serving the town of Hertford
Bayford, serving the villages of Bayford and Brickendon
Cuffley, serving the villages of Cuffley, Northaw and Goffs Oak
Crews Hill, serving the village of Crews Hill
Gordon Hill, serving Gordon Hill and Forty Hill, also close to Chase Farm Hospital.
Enfield Chase, serving Enfield Town
Grange Park, serving Grange Park
Winchmore Hill, serving Winchmore Hill
Palmers Green, serving Palmers Green
Bowes Park, serving Bowes Park, Bounds Green and Wood Green

It rejoins the East Coast Main Line at Wood Green South junction, north of Alexandra Palace railway station.

Operations
Great Northern operates suburban services along the Hertford Line between London King's Cross or Moorgate, and Stevenage, Watton-at-Stone or Hertford North.  Occasionally, London North Eastern Railway, Hull Trains, Grand Central and other faster Great Northern services operate non-stop along the route when diverted off the main section of the East Coast Main Line, due to engineering work. There is a reversing siding to the north of Bowes Park which is occasionally used to reverse London North Eastern Railway trains heading for the Bounds Green Depot.  There are also bay platforms at Hertford North, Stevenage, and Gordon Hill, the latter acting as a terminus during peak hours and night only.

Infrastructure

Grade-separated junctions connect each end of the northbound track with the main line. All stations are long enough to accept two, three-car (20m) EMUs. Not all stations are long enough for newly introduced 6-car EMUs, but their walk-through design allows for access.

Tunnels and viaducts
Major civil engineering structures on the Hertford Line include the following.

ERTMS trials on the Hertford loop line
Network Rail used Beacon Rail owned Class 313 unit 313121 as a test vehicle for ERTMS on the Hertford Line. The plan involved resignalling a  section of the double track route to allow existing passenger and freight services to work bi-directionally over the up Hertford loop line, freeing the down line for ERTMS tests and evaluation.

References

Hornby, Frank (1995) London Commuter Lines. Volume 1: Main lines north of the Thames. Kettering: Silver Link Publishing Ltd.

Rail transport in Hertfordshire
Railway lines opened in 1871
Railway lines in London
Railway loop lines
Railway lines in the East of England
Standard gauge railways in England
Transport in the London Borough of Enfield
Transport in the London Borough of Haringey